Seoul, officially known as the Seoul Special City, is the capital and largest metropolis of South Korea. According to the 2020 census, Seoul has a population of 9.9 million people, and forms the heart of the Seoul Capital Area with the surrounding Incheon metropolis and Gyeonggi province. Considered to be a global city and rated as an Alpha – City by Globalization and World Cities Research Network (GaWC), Seoul was the world's fourth largest metropolitan economy in 2014, following Tokyo, New York City and Los Angeles.

Seoul was rated Asia's most livable city with the second highest quality of life globally by Arcadis in 2015, with a GDP per capita (PPP) of around $40,000. With major technology hubs centered in Gangnam and Digital Media City, the Seoul Capital Area is home to the headquarters of 15 Fortune Global 500 companies, including Samsung, LG, and Hyundai. Ranked seventh in the Global Power City Index and Global Financial Centres Index, the metropolis exerts a major influence in global affairs as one of the five leading hosts of global conferences. Seoul has hosted the 1986 Asian Games, 1988 Summer Olympics, and the 2010 G20 Seoul summit.

Seoul was the capital of various Korean states, including Baekje, Joseon, the Korean Empire, Goryeo (as a secondary capital), and presently South Korea. It is strategically located along the Han River. Seoul's history stretches back over two thousand years, when it was founded in 18 BC by the people of Baekje, one of the Three Kingdoms of Korea. The city was later designated the capital of Korea under the Joseon dynasty. Seoul is surrounded by a mountainous and hilly landscape, with Bukhan Mountain located on the northern edge of the city. The Seoul Capital Area contains five UNESCO World Heritage Sites: Changdeok Palace, Hwaseong Fortress, Jongmyo Shrine, Namhansanseong and the Royal Tombs of the Joseon Dynasty. More recently, Seoul has been a major site of modern architectural construction – major modern landmarks include the N Seoul Tower, the 63 Building, the Lotte World Tower, the Dongdaemun Design Plaza, Lotte World, Trade Tower, COEX, IFC Seoul, and the Parc1. Seoul was named the 2010 World Design Capital. It is the birthplace of K-pop and the Korean wave, as it is the heart of Korean culture and massive medias, entertainment firms, and broadcasters.

Etymology

The city has been known in the past by the names Wiryeseong (during the Baekje era), Namcheon (during the Silla era), Hanyang (during the Goryeo era), Hanseong (during the Joseon era), and Keijō or Gyeongseong during Japanese rule.

During Japan's annexation of Korea, Hanseong was renamed  by the Imperial authorities to prevent confusion with the hanja '' (a transliteration of an ancient Korean word Han meaning "great"), which also refers to Han people or the Han dynasty in Chinese and in Japanese is a term for "China".

After World War II and Korea's liberation, the city took its present name, which originated from the Korean word meaning "capital city", which is believed to have descended from an ancient word, Seorabeol, which originally referred to Gyeongju, the capital of Silla. Ancient Gyeongju was also known in documents by the Chinese-style name Geumseong (literally "Gold Castle or City" or "Metal Castle or City"), but it is unclear whether the native Korean-style name Seorabeol had the same meaning as Geumseong.

Unlike most place names in Korea, "Seoul" has no corresponding hanja (Chinese characters used in the Korean language). On January 18, 2005, the Seoul government changed its official name in Chinese characters from the historic Hancheng to Shou'er.

History

Settlement of the Han River area, where present-day Seoul is located, began around 4000 BC.

Seoul is first recorded as Wiryeseong, the capital of Baekje (founded in 18 BC) in the northeastern area of modern Seoul. There are several city walls remaining in the area that date from this time. Pungnaptoseong, an earthen wall located southeast Seoul, is widely believed to have been at the main Wiryeseong site. As the Three Kingdoms competed for this strategic region, control passed from Baekje to Goguryeo in the 5th century.

However, according to Samguk Sagi, both Baekje and Silla described the land as frontier border of Baekje, not as the capital region. Moreover, Jinheung Taewang Stele found at current day Bukhansan tells that the place was underdeveloped as of 6th century AD, suggesting that the first capital Wiryeseong was not located in or nearby Seoul.

In July or August 553, Silla took the control of the region from Baekje, and the city became a part of newly established Sin Province (신주; 新州). Sin (新) has both meaning of "New" and "Silla", thus literally means New Silla Province.

In November 555, Jinheung Taewang made royal visit to Bukhansan, and inspected the borderline. In 557, Silla abolished Sin Province, and established Bukhansan Province (북한산주; 北漢山州). The word Hanseong (한성; 漢城; Han Fortress) appears on the stone wall of "Pyongyang Fortress", which was presumably built in the mid to late 6th century AD over period of 42 years, located in Pyongyang, while there is no evidence that Seoul had name Hanseong dating the three kingdoms and earlier period.

In 568, Jinheung Taewang made another royal visit to the northern border, visited Hanseong, and stayed in Namcheon on his way back to the capital. During his stay, he set Jinheung Taewang Stele, abolished Bukhansan Province, and established Namcheon Province (남천주; 南川州; South River Province), appointing the city as the provincial capital. Based on the naming system, the actual name of Han River during this time was likely Namcheon (Nam River) itself or should have the word ending with "cheon" (천; 川) not "gang" (강; 江) nor "su" (수; 水). In addition, "Bukhansan" Jinheung Stele clearly states that Silla had possession of Hanseong (modern day Pyongyang), thus Bukhansan has to be located north of Hanseong. Modern day Pyongyang was not Pyongyang, Taedong River was likely Han River, and Bukhansan was not Bukhansan during the three kingdoms period. Moreover, Pyongyang was a common noun meaning capital used by Goguryeo and Goryeo dynasties, similar to Seoul.

In 603, Goguryeo attacked Bukhansanseong (북한산성; 北漢山城; Bukhan Mountain Fortress), which Silla ended up winning. In 604, Silla abolished Namcheon Province, and reestablished Bukhansan Province in order to strengthen the northern border. The city lost its provincial capital position and was put under Bukhansan Province once again. This further proves that Bukhansan was located in the North of modern day Pyongyang as changing the provincial name and objective would not be required if Bukhansan was located within Seoul.

In the 11th century Goryeo, which succeeded Unified Silla, built a summer palace in Seoul, which was referred to as the "Southern Capital". It was only from this period that Seoul became a larger settlement. When Joseon replaced Goryeo, the capital was moved to Seoul (also known as Hanyang or Hanseong), where it remained until the fall of the dynasty. The Gyeongbok Palace, built in the 14th century, served as the royal residence until 1592. The other large palace, Changdeokgung, constructed in 1405, served as the main royal palace from 1611 to 1872. After Joseon changed its name to the Korean Empire in 1897, Hwangseong also designated Seoul.

Originally, the city was entirely surrounded by a massive circular stone wall to provide its citizens security from wild animals, thieves and attacks. The city has grown beyond those walls and although the wall no longer stands (except along Bugaksan Mountain, north of the downtown area), the gates remain near the downtown district of Seoul, including most notably Sungnyemun (commonly known as Namdaemun) and Heunginjimun (commonly known as Dongdaemun). During the Joseon dynasty, the gates were opened and closed each day, accompanied by the ringing of large bells at the Bosingak belfry. In the late 19th century, after hundreds of years of isolation, Seoul opened its gates to foreigners and began to modernize. Seoul became the first city in East Asia to introduce electricity in the royal palace, built by the Edison Illuminating Company and a decade later Seoul also implemented electrical street lights.

Much of the development was due to trade with foreign countries like France and the United States. For example, the Seoul Electric Company, Seoul Electric Trolley Company, and Seoul Fresh Spring Water Company were all joint Korean–U.S. owned enterprises. In 1904, an American by the name of Angus Hamilton visited the city and said, "The streets of Seoul are magnificent, spacious, clean, admirably made and well-drained. The narrow, dirty lanes have been widened, gutters have been covered, roadways broadened. Seoul is within measurable distance of becoming the highest, most interesting and cleanest city in the East."

After the annexation treaty in 1910, Japan annexed Korea and renamed the city Gyeongseong ("Kyongsong" in Korean and "Keijo" in Japanese). Japanese technology was imported, the city walls were removed, some of the gates demolished. Roads became paved and Western-style buildings were constructed. The city was liberated by U.S. forces at the end of World War II.

In 1945, the city was officially named Seoul, and was designated as a special city in 1949.

During the Korean War, Seoul changed hands between the Soviet/Chinese-backed North Korean forces and the American-backed South Korean forces several times, leaving the city heavily damaged after the war. The capital was temporarily relocated to Busan. One estimate of the extensive damage states that after the war, at least 191,000 buildings, 55,000 houses, and 1,000 factories lay in ruins. In addition, a flood of refugees had entered Seoul during the war, swelling the population of the city and its metropolitan area to an estimated 1.5 million by 1955.

Following the war, Seoul began to focus on reconstruction and modernization. As South Korea's economy started to grow rapidly from the 1960s, urbanization also accelerated and workers began to move to Seoul and other larger cities. From the 1970s, the size of Seoul administrative area greatly expanded as it annexed a number of towns and villages from several surrounding counties.

Until 1972, Seoul was claimed by North Korea as its de jure capital, being specified as such in Article 103 of the 1948 North Korean constitution.

South Korea's 2019 population was estimated at 51.71 million, and according to the 2018 Population and Housing Census, 49.8% of the population resided in the Seoul metropolitan area. This was up by 0.7% from 49.1% in 2010, showing a distinct trend toward the concentration of the population in the capital. Seoul has become the economic, political and cultural hub of the country, with several Fortune Global 500 companies, including Samsung, SK Holdings, Hyundai, POSCO and LG Group headquartered there.

Seoul was the host city of the 1986 Asian Games and 1988 Summer Olympics as well as one of the venues of the 2002 FIFA World Cup.

On 29 October 2022, at least 153 people were crushed to death when a crowd surged in an alleyway during Halloween festivities in Seoul's Itaewon district. President Yoon declared a state of official national mourning.

Geography

Seoul is in the northwest of South Korea. The Han River and its surrounding area played an important role in Korean history. The Three Kingdoms of Korea strove to take control of this land, where the river was used as a trade route to China (via the Yellow Sea). The river is no longer actively used for navigation, because its estuary is located at the borders of the two Koreas, with civilian entry barred. Historically, the city was during the Joseon dynasty bounded by the Seoul Fortress Wall, which stretched between the four main mountains in central Seoul: Bugaksan, Inwangsan, Naksan and Namsan. The city is bordered by eight mountains, as well as the more level lands of the Han River plain and western areas. Due to its geography and to economic development policies, Seoul is a very polycentric city. The area that was the old capital in the Joseon dynasty, and mostly comprises Jongno District and Jung District, constitutes the historical and political center of the city. However, for example, the city's financial capital is widely considered to be in Yeouido, while its economic capital is Gangnam District.

Climate

Seoul has a humid continental climate influenced by the monsoons (Köppen: Dwa). Being in the extreme East Asia, the climate can be described as humid subtropical (Cwa, by -3 °C isotherm) with great variation in temperature and precipitation throughout the year. The suburbs of Seoul are generally cooler than the center of Seoul because of the urban heat island effect. Summers are hot and humid, with the East Asian monsoon taking place from June until September. Heat index values can surpass  at the height of summer. 
Temperatures below  have been recorded.

Air quality

Air pollution is a major issue in Seoul. The Seoul Metropolitan Government monitors and publicly shares real-time air quality data.

Since the early 1960s, the Ministry of Environment has implemented a range of policies and air pollutant standards to improve and manage air quality for its people. The "Special Act on the Improvement of Air Quality in the Seoul Metropolitan Area" was passed in December 2003. Its 1st Seoul Metropolitan Air Quality Improvement Plan (2005–2014) focused on improving the concentrations of PM10 and nitrogen dioxide by reducing emissions. As a result, the annual average PM10 concentrations decreased from 70.0 μg/m3 in 2001 to 44.4 μg/m3 in 2011 and 46 μg/m3 in 2014. As of 2014, the annual average PM10 concentration was still at least twice than that recommended by the WHO Air Quality Guidelines. The 2nd Seoul Metropolitan Air Quality Improvement Plan (2015–2024) added PM2.5 and ozone to its list of managed pollutants.

Asian dust, emissions from Seoul and in general from the rest of South Korea, as well as emissions from China, all contribute to Seoul's air quality. A partnership between researchers in South Korea and the United States is conducting an international air quality field study in Korea (KORUS-AQ) to determine how much each source contributes.

Besides air quality, greenhouse gas emissions represent hot issues in South Korea since the country is among top-10 strongest emitters in the world. Seoul is the strongest hotspot of greenhouse gas emissions in the country and according to satellite data, the persistent carbon dioxide anomaly over the city is one of the strongest in the world.

Government

The Seoul Metropolitan Government is the local government for Seoul, and is responsible for the administration and provision of various services to the city, including correctional institutions, education, libraries, public safety, recreational facilities, sanitation, water supply, and welfare services. It is headed by a mayor and three vice mayors, and is divided into 25 autonomous districts and 522 administrative neighborhoods.

Administrative districts

Seoul is divided into 25 gu (district). The gu vary greatly in area (from ) and population (from fewer than 140,000 to 630,000). Songpa has the most people, while Seocho has the largest area. The government of each gu handles many of the functions that are handled by city governments in other jurisdictions. Each gu is divided into "dong" or neighborhoods. Some gu have only a few dong while others like Jongno District have a very large number of distinct neighborhoods. Gu of Seoul consist of 423 administrative dongs in total. Dong are also sub-divided into 13,787 tong, which are further divided into 102,796 ban in total.

Demographics

Seoul proper is noted for its population density, which is almost twice that of New York City and eight times greater than Rome. Its metropolitan area was the most densely populated among OECD countries in Asia in 2012, and second worldwide after that of Paris. As of 2015, the population was 9.86 million, in 2012, it was 10.44 million. As of 2021, the population is 9.59 million. As of the end of June 2011, 10.29 million Republic of Korea citizens lived in the city. This was a 0.24% decrease from the end of 2010. The population of Seoul has been dropping since the early 1990s, the reasons being the high costs of living, urban sprawling to Gyeonggi region's satellite bed cities and an aging population.

As of 2016, the number of foreigners living in Seoul was 404,037, 22.9% of the total foreign population in South Korea. As of June 2011, 186,631 foreigners were Chinese citizens of Korean ancestry. This was an 8.84% increase from the end of 2010 and a 12.85% increase from June 2010. The next largest group was Chinese citizens who are not of Korean ethnicity; 29,901 of them resided in Seoul. The next highest group consisted of the 9,999 United States citizens who were not of Korean ancestry. The next highest group were Taiwanese citizens, at 8,717.

The two major religions in Seoul are Christianity and Buddhism. Other religions include Muism (indigenous religion) and Confucianism. Seoul is home to one of the world's largest Christian congregations, Yoido Full Gospel Church, which has around 830,000 members. According to the 2015 census, 10.8% of the population follows Buddhism and 35% follows Christianity (24.3% Protestantism and 10.7% Catholicism). 53.6% of the population is irreligious.

Seoul is home to the world's largest modern university founded by a Buddhist Order, Dongguk University. Native Seoulites tend to speak the Gyeonggi dialect of Korean.

Economy

Seoul is the business and financial hub of South Korea. Although it accounts for only 0.6 percent of the nation's land area, 48.3 percent of South Korea's bank deposits were held in Seoul in 2003, and the city generated 23 percent of the country's GDP overall in 2012. In 2008 the Worldwide Centers of Commerce Index ranked Seoul No.9. The Global Financial Centres Index in 2015 listed Seoul as the 6th financially most competitive city in the world. The Economist Intelligence Unit ranked Seoul 15th in the list of "Overall 2025 City Competitiveness" regarding future competitiveness of cities.

Manufacturing
The traditional, labor-intensive manufacturing industries have been continuously replaced by information technology, electronics and assembly-type of industries; however, food and beverage production, as well as printing and publishing remained among the core industries. Major manufacturers are headquartered in the city, including Samsung, LG, Hyundai, Kia and SK. Notable food and beverage companies include Jinro, whose soju is the most sold alcoholic drink in the world, beating out Smirnoff vodka; top selling beer producers Hite (merged with Jinro) and Oriental Brewery. It also hosts food giants like Seoul Dairy Cooperative, Nongshim Group, Ottogi, CJ, Orion, Maeil Holdings, Namyang Dairy Products and Lotte.

Finance

Seoul hosts large concentration of headquarters of International companies and banks, including 15 companies on Fortune 500 list such as Samsung, LG and Hyundai. Most bank headquarters and the Korea Exchange are located in Yeouido (Yeoui island), which is often called "South Korea's Wall Street" and has been serving as the financial center of the city since the 1980s. The Seoul international finance center & SIFC MALL, Hanhwa 63 building, the Hanhwa insurance company head office. Hanhwa is one of the three largest South Korean insurance companies, along with Samsung Life and Gangnam & Kyobo life insurance group.

Commerce

The largest wholesale and retail market in South Korea, the Dongdaemun Market, is located in Seoul. Myeongdong is a shopping and entertainment area in downtown Seoul with mid- to high-end stores, fashion boutiques and international brand outlets. The nearby Namdaemun Market, named after the Namdaemun Gate, is the oldest continually running market in Seoul.

Insadong is the cultural art market of Seoul, where traditional and modern Korean artworks, such as paintings, sculptures and calligraphy are sold. Hwanghak-dong Flea Market and Janganpyeong Antique Market also offer antique products. Some shops for local designers have opened in Samcheong-dong, where numerous small art galleries are located. While Itaewon had catered mainly to foreign tourists and American soldiers based in the city, Koreans now comprise the majority of visitors to the area. The Gangnam district is one of the most affluent areas in Seoul and is noted for the fashionable and upscale Apgujeong-dong and Cheongdam-dong areas and the COEX Mall. Wholesale markets include Noryangjin Fisheries Wholesale Market and Garak Market.

The Yongsan Electronics Market is the largest electronics market in Asia. Electronics markets are Gangbyeon station metro line 2 Techno mart, ENTER6 MALL & Shindorim station Technomart mall complex.

Times Square is one of Seoul's largest shopping malls featuring the CGV Starium, the world's largest permanent 35 mm cinema screen.

Korea World Trade Center Complex, which comprises COEX mall, congress center, 3 Inter-continental hotels, Business tower (Asem tower), Residence hotel, Casino and City airport terminal was established in 1988 in time for the Seoul Olympics. The 2nd World trade trade center is being planned at Seoul Olympic stadium complex as MICE HUB by Seoul city. Ex-Kepco head office building was purchased by Hyundai motor group with 9billion USD to build 115-storey Hyundai GBC & hotel complex until 2021. Now ex-kepco 25-storey building is under demolition.

Technology
Seoul has been described as the world's "most wired city", ranked first in technology readiness by PwC's Cities of Opportunity report. Seoul has a very technologically advanced infrastructure.

Seoul is among the world leaders in Internet connectivity, being the capital of South Korea, which has the world's highest fiber-optic broadband penetration and highest global average internet speeds of 26.1 Mbit/s. Since 2015, Seoul has provided free Wi-Fi access in outdoor spaces through a 47.7 billion won ($44 million) project with Internet access at 10,430 parks, streets and other public places. Internet speeds in some apartment buildings reach up to 52.5Gbit/s with assistance from Nokia, and though the average standard consists of 100 Mbit/s services, providers nationwide are rapidly rolling out 1Gbit/s connections at the equivalent of US$20 per month. In addition, the city is served by the KTX high-speed rail and the Seoul Subway, which provides 4G LTE, WiFi and DMB inside subway cars. 5G will be introduced commercially in March 2019 in Seoul.

Architecture

The traditional heart of Seoul is the old Joseon dynasty city, now the downtown area, where most palaces, government offices, corporate headquarters, hotels, and traditional markets are located. Cheonggyecheon, a stream that runs from west to east through the valley before emptying into the Han River, was for many years covered with concrete, but was recently restored by an urban revival project in 2005. Jongno street, meaning "Bell Street", has been a principal street and one of the earliest commercial streets of the city, on which one can find Bosingak, a pavilion containing a large bell. The bell signaled the different times of the day and controlled the four major gates to the city. North of downtown is Bukhan Mountain, and to the south is the smaller Namsan. Further south are the old suburbs, Yongsan District and Mapo District. Across the Han River are the newer and wealthier areas of Gangnam District, Seocho District and surrounding neighborhoods.

Historical architecture

Seoul has many historical and cultural landmarks. In Amsa-dong Prehistoric Settlement Site, Gangdong District, neolithic remains were excavated and accidentally discovered by a flood in 1925.

Urban and civil planning was a key concept when Seoul was first designed to serve as a capital in the late 14th century. The Joseon dynasty built the "Five Grand Palaces" in Seoul – Changdeokgung, Changgyeonggung, Deoksugung, Gyeongbokgung and Gyeonghuigung – all of which are located in Jongno and Jung Districts. Among them, Changdeokgung was added to the UNESCO World Heritage List in 1997 as an "outstanding example of Far Eastern palace architecture and garden design". The main palace, Gyeongbokgung, underwent a large-scale restoration project. The palaces are considered exemplary architecture of the Joseon period. Beside the palaces, Unhyeongung is known for being the royal residence of Regent Daewongun, the father of Emperor Gojong at the end of the Joseon Dynasty.

Seoul has been surrounded by walls that were built to regulate visitors from other regions and protect the city in case of an invasion. Pungnap Toseong is a flat earthen wall built at the edge of the Han River, which is widely believed to be the site of Wiryeseong. Mongchon Toseong is another earthen wall built during the Baekje period that is now located inside the Olympic Park. The Fortress Wall of Seoul was built early in the Joseon dynasty for protection of the city. These gates include Sungnyemun and Heunginjimun, commonly known as Namdaemun (South Great Gate) and Dongdaemun (East Great Gate). Namdaemun was the oldest wooden gate until a 2008 arson attack, and was re-opened after complete restoration in 2013. Located near the gates are the traditional markets and largest shopping center, Namdaemun Market and Dongdaemun Market.

There are also many buildings constructed with international styles in the late 19th and early 20th centuries. The Independence Gate was built in 1897 to inspire an independent spirit. Seoul Station was opened in 1900 as Gyeongseong Station.

Modern architecture

Various high-rise office buildings and residential buildings, like the Gangnam Finance Center, the Tower Palace, Namsan Seoul Tower, and the Lotte World Tower, dominate the city's skyline. The tallest building is Lotte World Tower, reaching a height of 555m. It opened to the public in April 2017. It is also the 4th highest building in the world.

The World Trade Center Seoul, located in Gangnam District, hosts various expositions and conferences. Also in Gangnam District is the COEX Mall, a large indoor shopping and entertainment complex. Downstream from Gangnam District is Yeouido, an island that is home to the National Assembly, major broadcasting studios, and a number of large office buildings, as well as the Korea Finance Building and the Yoido Full Gospel Church. The Olympic Stadium, Olympic Park, and Lotte World are located in Songpa District, on the south side of the Han River, upstream from Gangnam District. Three new modern landmarks of Seoul are Dongdaemun Design Plaza & Park, designed by Zaha Hadid, the new wave-shaped Seoul City Hall, by Yoo Kerl of iArc, and the Lotte World Tower, the 5th tallest building in the world designed by Kohn Pedersen Fox.

In 2010 Seoul was designated the World Design Capital for the year.

Culture

Museums

Seoul is home to 115 museums, including four national and nine official municipal museums. Among the city's national museum, The National Museum of Korea is the most representative of museums in not only Seoul but all of South Korea. Since its establishment in 1945, the museum has built a collection of 220,000 artifacts. In October 2005, the museum moved to a new building in Yongsan Family Park.

The National Folk Museum is located on the grounds of the Gyeongbokgung Palace in the district of Jongno District and uses replicas of historical objects to illustrate the folk history of the Korean people. The National Palace Museum of Korea is also located on the grounds of the Gyeongbokgung Palace. Finally, the Seoul branch of the National Museum of Modern and Contemporary Art, whose main museum is located in Gwacheon, opened in 2013, in Sogyeok-dong.

Bukchon Hanok Village and Namsangol Hanok Village are old residential districts consisting of hanok Korean traditional houses, parks, and museums that allows visitors to experience traditional Korean culture.

The War Memorial, one of nine municipal museums in Seoul, offers visitors an educational and emotional experience of various wars in which Korea was involved, including Korean War themes. The Seodaemun Prison is a former prison built during the Japanese occupation, and is used as a historic museum.

The Seoul Museum of Art and Ilmin Museum of Art have preserved the appearance of the old building that is visually unique from the neighboring tall, modern buildings. The former is operated by Seoul City Council and sits adjacent to Gyeonghuigung Palace, a Joseon dynasty royal palace. Leeum, Samsung Museum of Art, is widely regarded as one of Seoul's largest private museum. For many Korean film lovers from all over the world, the Korean Film Archive is running the Korean Film Museum and Cinematheque KOFA in its main center located in Digital Media City(DMC), Sangam-dong. The Tteok & Kitchen Utensil Museum and Kimchi Field Museum provide information regarding Korean culinary history.

Religious monuments

There are also religious buildings that take important roles in Korean society and politics. The Wongudan altar was a sacrificial place where Korean rulers held heavenly rituals since the Three Kingdoms period. Since the Joseon dynasty adopted Confucianism as its national ideology in the 14th century, the state built many Confucian shrines. The descendants of the Joseon royal family still continue to hold ceremonies to commemorate ancestors at Jongmyo. It is the oldest royal Confucian shrine preserved and the ritual ceremonies continue a tradition established in the 14th century. Sajikdan, Munmyo and Dongmyo were built during the same period. Although Buddhism was suppressed by the Joseon state, it has continued its existence. Jogyesa is the headquarters of the Jogye Order of Korean Buddhism. Hwagyesa and Bongeunsa are also major Buddhist temples in Seoul.

The Myeongdong Cathedral is a landmark of the Myeongdong, Jung District and the biggest Catholic church in Seoul established in 1883. It is a symbol of Catholicism in Korea. It was also a focus for political dissent in the 1980s. In this way the Roman Catholic Church has a very strong influence in Korean society. And Yakhyeon Catholic Church in Jungnim-dong, Jung District is first Catholic parish in Korea. It has been the first Gothic church ever built in Korea.

There are many Protestant churches in Seoul. The most numerous are Presbyterian, but there are also many Methodist and Baptist churches. Yoido Full Gospel Church is a Pentecostal church affiliated with the Assemblies of God on Yeouido in Seoul. With approximately 830,000 members (2007), it is the largest Pentecostal Christian congregation in the world, which has been recognized by the Guinness Book of World Records.

The St. Nicholas Cathedral, but sometimes called bald church, is the only Byzantine-style church in Seoul. It is located in Ahyeon-dong, Mapo District, and is cathedral of the Orthodox Metropolis of Korea. In 2015, it was designated as a Seoul Future Heritage.

Festivals
In October 2012, KBS Hall in Seoul hosted major international music festivals – First ABU TV and Radio Song Festivals within frameworks of Asia-Pacific Broadcasting Union 49th General Assembly.
Hi! Seoul Festival is a seasonal cultural festival held four times a year every spring, summer, autumn, and winter in Seoul, South Korea since 2003. It is based on the "Seoul Citizens' Day" held on every October since 1994 to commemorate the 600 years history of Seoul as the capital of the country. The festival is arranged under the Seoul Metropolitan Government. , Seoul has hosted Ultra Music Festival Korea, an annual dance music festival that takes place on the 2nd weekend of June.

Parks

Despite the city's population density, Seoul has a large quantity of parks. One of the most famous parks is Namsan Park, which offers recreational hiking and views of the downtown Seoul skyline. The N Seoul Tower is located at Namsan Park. Seoul Olympic Park, located in Songpa District and built to host the 1988 Summer Olympics is Seoul's largest park. Among the other largest parks in the city are Seoul Forest, Dream Forest, Children's Grand Park and Haneul Park. Areas around streams serve as public places for relaxation and recreation. Tancheon stream and the nearby area serve as a large park with paths for both walkers and cyclists.
Cheonggyecheon, a stream that runs nearly  through downtown Seoul, is popular among both Seoul residents and tourists. In 2017 the Seoullo 7017 Skypark opened, spanning diagonally overtop Seoul Station.

There are also many parks along the Han River, such as Ichon Hangang Park, Yeouido Hangang Park, Mangwon Hangang Park, Nanji Hangang Park, Banpo Hangang Park, Ttukseom Hangang Park and Jamsil Hangang Park.
The Seoul National Capital Area also contains a green belt aimed at preventing the city from sprawling out into neighboring Gyeonggi Province. These areas are frequently sought after by people looking to escape from urban life on weekends and during vacations.
There are also various parks under construction or in project, such as the Gyeongui Line Forest Trail, Seoul Station 7017, Seosomun Memorial Park and Yongsan Park.

Seoul is also home to the world's largest indoor amusement park, Lotte World. Other recreation centers include the former Olympic and World Cup stadiums and the City Hall public lawn.

Media

Seoul is home of the major South Korean networks KBS, SBS, and MBC. The city is also home to the major South Korean newspapers Chosun Ilbo, Donga Ilbo, Joongang Ilbo, and Hankook Ilbo.

Sports

Seoul is a major center of South Korean sports, and has the largest number of professional sports teams and facilities in the country.

In the history of South Korea's major professional sports league championships, which include the K League, KBO League, KBL, and V-League, Seoul had multiple championship winners during the same season twice; in 1990, when Lucky-Goldstar FC (currently FC Seoul) won the 1990 K League and the LG Twins won the 1990 KBO League, and in 2016, when FC Seoul won the 2016 K League Classic and the Doosan Bears won the 2016 KBO League.

International competition
Seoul hosted the 1986 Asian Games, also known as Asiad, 1988 Olympic Games, and Paralympic Games. It also served as one of the host cities of the 2002 FIFA World Cup. Seoul World Cup Stadium hosted the opening ceremony and first game of the tournament.

Taekwondo is South Korea's national sport and Seoul is the location of the Kukkiwon, the world headquarters of taekwondo, as well as the World Taekwondo Federation.

Domestic sports clubs

Football

Seoul's most well-known football club is FC Seoul.

 Men's football

 Women's football

Baseball

Basketball

Volleyball

Handball
Seoul City

Transportation

Seoul has a well developed transportation network. Its system dates back to the era of the Korean Empire, when the first streetcar lines were laid and a railroad linking Seoul and Incheon was completed. Seoul's most important streetcar line ran along Jongno until it was replaced by Line 1 of the subway system in the early 1970s. Other notable streets in downtown Seoul include Euljiro, Teheranno, Sejongno, Chungmuro, Yulgongno, and Toegyero. , 25% of the population has a commute time of an hour or longer.

Bus

Seoul's bus system is operated by the Seoul Metropolitan Government (S.M.G.), with four primary bus configurations available servicing most of the city. Seoul has many large intercity/express bus terminals. These buses connect Seoul with cities throughout South Korea. The Seoul Express Bus Terminal, Central City Terminal and Seoul Nambu Terminal are located in the district of Seocho District. In addition, East Seoul Bus Terminal in Gwangjin District and Sangbong Terminal in Jungnang District handles traffics mainly from Gangwon and Chungcheong provinces.

Urban rail

Seoul has a comprehensive urban railway network of 21 rapid transit, light metro and commuter lines that interconnects every district of the city and the surrounding areas of Incheon, Gyeonggi province, western Gangwon province, and northern Chungnam province. In addition, in order to cope with the various modes of transport, Seoul's metropolitan government employs several mathematicians to coordinate the subway, bus, and traffic schedules into one timetable. The various lines are run by Korail, Seoul Metro, NeoTrans Co. Ltd., AREX, and Seoul Metro Line 9 Corporation.

Train

Seoul is connected to every major city in South Korea by rail. The Mugunghwa and Saemaeul trains also stop at all major stations. Major railroad stations include:
 Seoul Station, Yongsan District: Gyeongbu line (KTX/ITX-Saemaeul/Nuriro/Mugunghwa-ho)
 Yongsan station, Yongsan District: Honam line (KTX/ITX-Saemaeul/Nuriro/Mugunghwa), Jeolla/Janghang lines (Saemaul/Mugunghwa)
 Yeongdeungpo station, Yeongdeungpo District: Gyeongbu/Honam/Janghang lines (KTX/ITX-Saemaeul/Saemaul/Nuriro/Mugunghwa)
 Cheongnyangni station, Dongdaemun District: Gyeongchun/Jungang/Yeongdong/Taebaek lines (ITX-Cheongchun/ITX-Saemaeul/Mugunghwa)
 Suseo station (HSR), Gangnam District: Suseo HSR (SRT)

Airports
Seoul is served by two international airports, Incheon International Airport and Gimpo International Airport.

Gimpo International Airport opened in 1939 as an airfield for the Japanese Imperial Army and opened for civil aircraft in 1957. Since the opening of Incheon International, Gimpo International handles domestic flights along with some short haul international flights to Tokyo Haneda, Osaka Kansai, Taipei Songshan, Shanghai Hongqiao, and Beijing Capital although flights to Osaka Kansai and Beijing Capital also operate from Incheon International.

Incheon International Airport opened in March 2001 in Yeongjong island. It is now responsible for major international flights. Incheon International Airport is Asia's eighth busiest airport in terms of passengers, the world's fourth busiest airport by cargo traffic, and the world's eighth busiest airport in terms of international passengers in 2014. In 2016, 57,765,397 passengers used the airport. Incheon International Airport opened terminal 2 on January 18, 2018.

Incheon and Gimpo are linked to Seoul by expressway, and to each other by the AREX to Seoul Station. Intercity bus services are available to various destinations around the country.

Cycling
Cycling is becoming increasingly popular in Seoul and in the entire country. Both banks of the Han River have cycling paths that run all the way across the city along the river. In addition, Seoul introduced in 2015 a bicycle-sharing system named Ddareungi (and named Seoul Bike in English).

Education

Universities

Seoul is home to the majority of South Korea's most prestigious universities, including Seoul National University, Yonsei University, Korea University.

Seoul ranked 2nd on the QS Best Student Cities 2023.

Secondary education
Compulsory education lasts from grade 1–9 (six years of elementary school and 3 years of middle school). Students spend six years in elementary school, three years in middle school, and three years in high school. Secondary schools generally require students to wear uniforms. There is an exit exam for graduating from high school and many students proceeding to the university level are required to take the College Scholastic Ability Test that is held every November. Although there is a test for non-high school graduates, called school qualification exam, most Koreans take the test.

Seoul is home to various specialized schools, including three science high schools, and six foreign language High Schools. Seoul Metropolitan Office of Education comprises 235 College-Preparatory High Schools, 80 Vocational Schools, 377 Middle Schools, and 33 Special Education Schools .

International relations

Seoul is a member of the Asian Network of Major Cities 21 and the C40 Cities Climate Leadership Group. In addition, Seoul hosts many embassies of countries it has diplomatic ties with.

Sister cities

Seoul has 23 sister cities:

See also
 Geography of South Korea
 List of cities in South Korea
 List of most populous cities

References

External links

Official sites

Tourism and living information
 i Tour Seoul – The Official Seoul Tourism Guide Site

 
Capitals in Asia
Seoul Capital Area
Special Cities and Metropolitan Cities of South Korea
Populated places with period of establishment missing